Some of My Best Friends Are DJs is the second studio album by Canadian turntablist Kid Koala, released on Ninja Tune in 2003. It peaked at number 26 on the UK Independent Albums Chart.

Critical reception

On Metacritic, Some of My Best Friends Are DJs received an average score of 78 out of 100 based on 16 reviews, indicating "generally favorable reviews".

Sam Samuelson of AllMusic gave the album 4.5 stars out of 5, saying: "More subtle than Carpal Tunnel Syndrome, Some of My Best Friends Are DJs shows a serious artist crafting his medium."

In an article for the Los Angeles Times, Susan Carpenter described the album as "sound collage to the extreme, a comedic smorgasbord that makes excellent use of some of the more bizarre spoken-word snippets that have been committed to vinyl over the years."

Track listing

Charts

References

External links
 

2003 albums
Kid Koala albums
Ninja Tune albums
Sound collage albums